Alexander Charles Kew (born 21 October 1986) is an English actor, musician, and singer-songwriter from High Wycombe, Buckinghamshire. He is best known for his roles as Declan in 2point4 Children and as Josh Barker in My Parents Are Aliens.

TV and film
He is best known for playing Josh Barker in the children's sitcom My Parents Are Aliens. He has also played a variety of other parts, most notably Declan in the final series of 2point4 Children. He has also appeared in ITV1's The Bill, as Oliver Sinclair (Ollie) in the pilot episode of BBC Three comedy Coming of Age and as Simon Cosgrove in the film About a Boy.

Theatre
Kew's first theatre role was in Stephen Daldry's production of An Inspector Calls at the Garrick Theatre. He also played the bell boy in David Lan's revival of Thornton Wilder's play 'Skin of our Teeth' at the Young Vic in 2004.

Music
Also a singer and guitarist, Kew joined a local rock band, The Wutars in 2009, making his onstage debut at the launch of their first EP at London's 100 Club. After the band's split in July 2011, he has continued to record and perform as a solo artist.

External links

1986 births
Living people
English male film actors
English male television actors
Male actors from Buckinghamshire
Musicians from Buckinghamshire
People from High Wycombe
English multi-instrumentalists
English male singer-songwriters
English male child actors
21st-century English singers
21st-century British male singers